Jackpot is a 2001 American comedy-drama film directed by Michael Polish and written by Michael and his brother, Mark Polish.  It had a limited release in the United States on July 27, 2001.

Plot
Sunny Holiday, an aspiring singer, abandons his wife and young daughter to embark on a tour of karaoke bars in search of the elusive big break that will catapult him to country music stardom. Living out of a pink Chrysler for months, he and his manager meet various strangers along the way, all of whom they inevitably alienate by trying to sell a concentrated household cleaner or committing some other faux pas. Eventually, the frustrations fueled by their many disappointments nearly tear their friendship apart, and they are forced to return to the lives they had left behind.

Cast

Production
It was the first feature film shot on 24P HD and released in cinemas on 35mm film, using the Sony CineAlta F900.

Reception
, the film holds a 29% approval rating on Rotten Tomatoes, based on 55 reviews with an average rating of 4.39/10. The website's critics consensus reads: "A somewhat aimless movie that's too artsy for its own good."

Accolades
Independent Spirit Awards
Won: John Cassavetes Award, Michael Polish (director/producer/writer), Mark Polish (producer/writer) (2002)
Nominated: Best Supporting Male, Garrett Morris (2002)

New American Cinema Award
Won: Michael Polish

References

External links
 
 

2001 films
American comedy-drama films
American independent films
2001 comedy-drama films
Films directed by Michael Polish
2001 comedy films
2001 drama films
2001 independent films
2000s English-language films
2000s American films
John Cassavetes Award winners